Family Reunion: A Relative Nightmare is a 1995 television film, starring Melissa Joan Hart and Jason Marsden. It was co-written, co-produced and directed by Neal Israel. The film was originally aired by ABC on April 1, 1995.

Plot

The teenage Billy Dooley (Jason Marsden) has to deal with his ultra-competitive family's annual reunion and his suddenly interest in a mysterious runaway girl (Melissa Joan Hart) who happens to be in that reunion.

Cast
 Melissa Joan Hart as Samantha
 Jason Marsden as Billy Dooley
 David L. Lander as Various Jamesons
 Romy Windsor as Grace Dooley
 Marcia Strassman as Margaret McKenna

References

External links
 
 

Films directed by Neal Israel
1990s English-language films